Euphlyctis is a genus of frogs in family Dicroglossidae distributed from the southwestern Arabian Peninsula, Pakistan and Afghanistan to India, Nepal, through Myanmar and Thailand to Malaya, and Sri Lanka. None of the four species assessed by the IUCN is considered threatened.

Species
There are eight species recognised in the genus Euphlyctis:
 Euphlyctis aloysii Joshy, Alam, Kurabayashi, Sumida, and Kuramoto, 2009
 Euphlyctis cyanophlyctis (Schneider, 1799)
 Euphlyctis ehrenbergii (Peters, 1863)
 Euphlyctis ghoshi (Chanda, 1991)
 Euphlyctis hexadactylus (Lesson, 1834)
 Euphlyctis kalasgramensis Howlader, Nair, Gopalan, and Merilä, 2015
 Euphlyctis karaavali Priti, Naik, Seshadri, Singal, Vidisha, Ravikanth, and Gururaja, 2016
 Euphlyctis kerala Dinesh, Channakeshavamurthy, Deepak, Ghosh, and Deuti, 2021

 Euphlyctis mudigere Joshy, Alam, Kurabayashi, Sumida, and Kuramoto, 2009 was placed into the synonymy of Euphlyctis cyanophlyctis

References

 
Dicroglossidae
Amphibians of Asia
Amphibian genera
Taxa named by Leopold Fitzinger